The following NASCAR national series were held in 2011:

2011 NASCAR Sprint Cup Series – The top racing series in NASCAR
2011 NASCAR Nationwide Series – The second-highest racing series in NASCAR
2011 NASCAR Camping World Truck Series – The third-highest racing series in NASCAR
2011 NASCAR Corona Series – Primary series of NASCAR Mexico
2011 NASCAR Stock V6 Series – Secondary series of NASCAR Mexico

 
NASCAR seasons